Claude Tessier (8 February 1943 – 8 November 2010) was a Liberal party member of the House of Commons of Canada. He was a professor and administrator by career.

Born in Sainte-Thècle, Quebec, Tessier represented the Quebec riding of Compton, later known as Mégantic—Compton—Stanstead. Following an unsuccessful attempt to gain the riding in the 1972 federal election, he defeated the Social Credit incumbent Henry Latulippe in the 1974 election. Tessier was re-elected in 1979 and 1980, but lost to François Gérin of the Progressive Conservative party in the 1984 election. Tessier served three successive terms from the 30th to 32nd Canadian Parliaments.

electoral record

References 

1943 births
2010 deaths
Members of the House of Commons of Canada from Quebec
Liberal Party of Canada MPs
People from Mauricie